Chris Wheeler (born August 9, 1945) is a former announcer and color commentator for the Philadelphia Phillies in Major League Baseball. He is nicknamed "Wheels".

Wheeler attended Marple Newtown High School in Pennsylvania and received a B.A. in journalism from Penn State University in 1967. Following graduation, he began his broadcasting career with WCAU radio in Philadelphia, where he was an airborne traffic reporter as well as a news writer and reporter. He later worked at WBBM in Chicago and CBS Radio in New York.

Wheeler joined the Phillies as assistant director of publicity and public relations in 1971 and began broadcasting in 1977. In 1982, he also was made director of the Phillies' community relations department. He was the camp coordinator for Phillies Dream Week from 1983 to 1999 and ran the team's speakers bureau from 1991 to 1997.  He was released as a Phillies broadcaster on January 8, 2014.

References

1945 births
Living people
American sports announcers
Major League Baseball broadcasters
Donald P. Bellisario College of Communications alumni
People from Darby, Pennsylvania
People from Egg Harbor Township, New Jersey
Philadelphia Phillies announcers
Baseball players from Pennsylvania